Mesochori is a village and a community of the Elassona municipality. Before the 2011 local government reform it was a part of the municipality of Potamia, of which it was a municipal district. The 2011 census recorded 551 inhabitants in the village. The community of Mesochori covers an area of 31.721 km2.

Economy
The population of Mesochori is occupied in animal husbandry and agriculture (mainly tobacco).

Population
According to the 2011 census, the population of the settlement of Mesochori was 551 people, a decrease of almost 1% compared with the population of the previous census of 2001.

See also
 List of settlements in the Larissa regional unit

References

Populated places in Larissa (regional unit)